Karl Koopman (1 April 1920 – 22 September 1997) was an American zoologist with a special interest in bats. He worked for many years in the Mammalogy Department of the American Museum of Natural History in New York.

Eponyms
Mammal species named after him include Monticolomys koopmani, Rattus koopmani, and Sturnira koopmanhilli.

Also, a reptile species, Anolis koopmani, is named in his honor.

References

Further reading

1920 births
1997 deaths
20th-century American zoologists
American mammalogists